Paweł Zatorski (born 21 June 1990) is a Polish professional volleyball player. He is a member of the Poland national team, a participant in the Olympic Games (Rio 2016, Tokyo 2020), two–time World Champion (2014, 2018), 2012 World League winner, and the 2021 Champions League winner. At the professional club level, he plays for Asseco Resovia.

Personal life
On 10 September 2016, he married Agnieszka Ludkiewicz. In February 2017, he graduated from the Academy of Management and Administration in Opole with master's degree in sports marketing. On 9 August 2017, their son Samuel was born. On 4 July 2019, his second child, a son Maksymilian was born.

Career

Clubs
Zatorski is an alumnus of Skra Bełchatów. He represented the second team of the club from Bełchatów. In that time, he won two titles of the Polish Champion (as a cadet and junior). In 2008, he moved to AZS Częstochowa and debuted in the top Polish volleyball league – PlusLiga. In 2010, he returned to PGE Skra Bełchatów. He spent four seasons in Skra, winning two medals of the Club World Championship – silver in 2010 and bronze in 2012, silver medal of the Champions League, two Polish Cups (2011, 2012), and two Polish Champion titles in 2011 and 2014. On 6 May 2014, it was officially announced that Zatorski had signed a contract with ZAKSA Kędzierzyn-Koźle for the next two seasons. On 26 April 2016, he won his third title of the Polish Champion, this time with ZAKSA. On 2 May 2016, it was announced that Zatorski extended his contract for the next two seasons (until 2018).

National team
On 8 July 2012, Zatorski won a gold medal of the 2012 World League in Sofia, Bulgaria. On 16 August 2014, Zatorski was chosen to represent his national team at the World Championship held in Poland. On 21 September 2014, he won a title of the World Champion. On 27 October 2014, he received a state award granted by the Polish president of that time, Bronisław Komorowski – Gold Cross of Merit for outstanding sports achievements and worldwide promotion of Poland.

On 30 September 2018, Poland achieved its third title of the World Champion. Poland beat Brazil in the final (3–0), and defended the title from 2014. Zatorski received an individual award for the Best Libero of the tournament.

Honours

Clubs
 CEV Champions League
  2011/2012 – with PGE Skra Bełchatów
  2020/2021 – with ZAKSA Kędzierzyn-Koźle
 FIVB Club World Championship
  Doha 2010 – with PGE Skra Bełchatów
 National championships
 2010/2011  Polish Cup, with PGE Skra Bełchatów
 2010/2011  Polish Championship, with PGE Skra Bełchatów
 2011/2012  Polish Cup, with PGE Skra Bełchatów
 2012/2013  Polish SuperCup, with PGE Skra Bełchatów
 2013/2014  Polish Championship, with PGE Skra Bełchatów
 2015/2016  Polish Championship, with ZAKSA Kędzierzyn-Koźle
 2016/2017  Polish Cup, with ZAKSA Kędzierzyn-Koźle
 2016/2017  Polish Championship, with ZAKSA Kędzierzyn-Koźle
 2018/2019  Polish Championship, with ZAKSA Kędzierzyn-Koźle
 2018/2019  Polish Cup, with ZAKSA Kędzierzyn-Koźle
 2019/2020  Polish SuperCup, with ZAKSA Kędzierzyn-Koźle
 2020/2021  Polish SuperCup, with ZAKSA Kędzierzyn-Koźle
 2020/2021  Polish Cup, with ZAKSA Kędzierzyn-Koźle

Youth national team
 2007  CEV U19 European Championship

Individual awards
 2010: FIVB Club World Championship – Best Libero
 2011: Polish Cup – Best Defender
 2012: Polish Cup – Best Defender
 2015: FIVB World League – Best Libero
 2016: Polish Cup – Best Defender
 2018: FIVB World Championship – Best Libero
 2019: Polish Cup – Best Defender

State awards
 2014:  Gold Cross of Merit
 2018:  Knight's Cross of Polonia Restituta

References

External links

 
 Player profile at PlusLiga.pl 
 
 
 Player profile at Volleybox.net

1990 births
Living people
Sportspeople from Łódź
Polish men's volleyball players
Polish Champions of men's volleyball
Recipients of the Gold Cross of Merit (Poland)
Olympic volleyball players of Poland
Volleyball players at the 2016 Summer Olympics
Volleyball players at the 2020 Summer Olympics
AZS Częstochowa players
Skra Bełchatów players
ZAKSA Kędzierzyn-Koźle players
Resovia (volleyball) players
Liberos